is a Japanese manga series written and illustrated by Ahndongshik. It was serialized in Shogakukan's Monthly Shōnen Sunday from May 2015 to April 2018.

Plot
Set in an alternate version of Japan with heavy Western influences, Renjoh Desparado is the story of a wandering swordswoman named Monko, who drifts from town to town looking for her ideal husband. Over the course of her journey, she often ends up rescuing someone from their predicament, only to find out the man she's pursuing isn't as faithful or noble as they first appear. Even so, Monko continues her search for her perfect man, while various figures from her past seek to capture or kill her, including the Shogun.

Publication
Renjoh Desperado, written and illustrated by Ahndongshik, was serialized in Shogakukan's Monthly Shōnen Sunday from May 12, 2015 to April 12, 2018. Shogakukan collected its chapters in six tankōbon volumes, released from November 12, 2015 to June 12, 2018.

In North America, Denpa announced in July 2021 that they had licensed the manga. The first volume is set to be released in August 2023.

The manga was licensed in France by Kurokawa.

Volume list

References

External links
 

Action anime and manga
Romantic comedy anime and manga
Shogakukan manga
Shōnen manga